Pimelea holroydii is a species of flowering plant in the family Thymelaeaceae and is endemic to the north of Western Australia. It is an erect shrub with egg-shaped leaves arranged more or less in opposite pairs, and head-like clusters of white or cream-coloured, tube-shaped flowers.

Description
As the flowers develop, the heads become more elongated. Flowering occurs in January and February and from August to October.

Taxonomy
Pimelea holroydii was first formally described in 1868 by Ferdinand von Mueller in Fragmenta Phytographiae Australiae from specimens collected by Charles Harper in the Hamersley Range. The specific epithet (holroydii) honours Arthur Holroyd.

Distribution and habitat
This pimelea grows on red, clayey soil from the Hamersley Range to Mount James Station in the  Gascoyne, Murchison and Pilbara bioregions of northern Western Australia.

Conservation status
Pimelea holroydii is listed as "not threatened" by the Government of Western Australia Department of Biodiversity, Conservation and Attractions.

References

Malvales of Australia
holroydii
Flora of Western Australia
Taxa named by Ferdinand von Mueller
Plants described in 1868